Ada McQuillan was an American screenwriter active during Hollywood's silent era. On many of her screenplays, she collaborated with fellow writer Gladys Gordon.

Selected filmography 

 Jazzland (1928)
 The Girl He Didn't Buy (1928)
 Golden Shackles (1928)
 Wilful Youth (1927)
 Web of Fate (1927)
 The Wise Guy (1926)

References 

American women screenwriters
American screenwriters
Year of birth missing
Year of death missing